Euphorbia epiphylloides is a species of plant in the family Euphorbiaceae. It is endemic to the Andaman Islands.

References

epiphylloides
Flora of the Andaman Islands
Endangered plants
Taxonomy articles created by Polbot
Plants described in 1873